Pellín Rodríguez (December 4, 1926 – October 31, 1984), was a Salsa singer.  Rodríguez was a member of the musical group El Gran Combo and toured with them all over Latin America and Europe, gaining fame and popularity as a singer. In addition to his singing capabilities, Rodríguez had great comedic abilities and participated on comedy bits on various TV shows in Puerto Rico.

Early life
Pellín Rodríguez (born Pedro Rodríguez de Gracia  ) was born and raised in Santurce, a sector of San Juan, the capital city of Puerto Rico. His parents, Tomasita De Gracia and  Zenón Rodríguez, were poor and Rodríguez was only able to complete his primary education. He had to work in various jobs in order to help his family financially. During his adolescence, Rodríguez demonstrated his musical talents singing in church and in plays at school. He was related to Gilberto Concepción de Gracia, the principal founder of the Partido Independentista Puertorriqueño (Puerto Rican Independence Party), or PIP.

Musical career

Early Years
Rodríguez started his musical career in 1942 when he joined Leopoldo Salgado's Conjunto Moderno. Soon after Rodríguez joined Johnny Seguí's Dandies Del 42 followed by a short stint with Orquesta Carmelo Díaz Soler. Rodríguez also played with Moncho Usera's orchestra, Manuel "Canario" Jiménez quartet, Mario Dumont's orchestra, Rafael Muñoz orchestra and Rafael Elvira's Orquesta Tropicana where he shared vocal duties with Gilberto Monroig.

In 1947 Rodríguez was hired by Noro Morales to join his orchestra. During the late 1940s and early 1950s Rodríguez also played with Xavier Cugat, José Curbelo and Tito Puente in prestigious dancing venues in New York City such as the Palladium Ballroom, Paramount Theater and China Doll Club.

In 1954 Rodríguez recorded several singles with Alfred Levy's band (Alfredito And His Orchestra) which were later compiled on a few EPs and LPs.

Rodríguez has two writing credits on the songs Saoco and "El Mantequero", both recorded by Cortijo Y Su Combo between the late 50s and early 60s.

Rodríguez moved to Chicago in the mid 1950s, where he joined Orquesta Nuevo Ritmo de Cuba, led by Armando Sánchez.

In 1960 Rodríguez moved to Puerto Rico and played with Rafael Elvira's Super Orquesta Tropicana later followed by a short stint with Noro Morales Orchestra before joining El Gran Combo.

El Gran Combo
In 1962 after Cortijo Y Su Combo disbanded, some of its members got together and founded El Gran Combo. Rodríguez joined them and shared vocal duties with Andy Montañez.

Rodríguez toured with the group all over Europe and Latin America, gaining fame and popularity as a singer. Rodríguez was the lead singer for more than 100 songs with El Gran Combo and recorded over 20 studio albums with them.  Rodríguez also appears on over 20 compilations of the group.

During his decade with El Gran Combo, the group enjoyed commercial success and received several awards and international recognitions. Among them a couple of Gold Records.

In September 1972 El Gran Combo released the album Por El Libro. It was  Rodríguez last studio recording with the group. During rehearsals for their upcoming record, En Acción, the leader of El Gran Combo, Rafael Ithier found out that Rodríguez had signed a contract with Borinquen Records. Rodríguez told Ithier that he was going to record an album of Boleros and that he was going to continue singing Guarachas with El Gran Combo. Ithier felt that was not a good idea and was not willing to take that risk of having Rodríguez as a member of the band and as a solo artist at the same time. Ithier suggested that Rodríguez should leave the band and Rodríguez left to pursue a solo career.

Solo Artist (Borinquen Records)

Rodríguez first solo album with Puerto Rico-based music label Borinquen Records, Amor Por Tí, was recorded in two weeks and released in April 1973. The album was a commercial success earning Rodríguez a Gold Record award and the single of the same name earned a Platinum Record award. During the time Rodríguez was signed to Borinquen Records, he recorded six studio albums and he also participated on several compilation albums for the label. Most of the arrangements and orchestration of Rodríguez music while he was at Borinquen Records were done by Bobby Valentín and his band.

Nuestra Orquesta La Salsa Mayor
In 1978 several musicians that had left Oscar D'León Salsa Mayor asked Rodríguez to join their band. Rodríguez accepted and moved to Venezuela. The new band went by the name of Nuestra Orquesta La Salsa Mayor. For their first album Rodríguez shared lead vocals duties with Leo Pacheco and Carlos El Grande (Calixto Ferrer Pérez). In 1979 they released a second album where Rodríguez shared lead vocals duties with Leo Pacheco and Freddy Nieto who replaced Carlos El Grande.

Andy & Pellín
After two albums with Nuestra Orquesta La Salsa Mayor, Rodríguez left the band and joined forces with his old partner from El Gran Combo Andy Montañez to record a new album. In 1979 they released the album "Encuentro Cercano De Dos Grandes" Andy & Pellín. The lead track of the album (Alacrán) was a direct response to a snide remark made in an El Gran Combo song released after Montañez left El Gran Combo.

Reflexiones Pasadas
In 1981 Rodríguez recorded his last studio album as a solo artist, Reflexiones Pasadas. The album was produced and directed by renowned pianist and arranger Jorge Millet. It was the last album Millet worked on before he died.

El Combo Del Ayer
In 1982 under the initiative of Johnny "El Bravo" López, a few ex-members from El Gran Combo reunited to form a group by the name of El Combo Del Ayer. Among them were Pellín Rodríguez, Elías Lopes, Roberto Roena, Milton Correa & Martín Quiñónez. They released three studio recordings and toured extensively between 1982 and 1984. The group disbanded after Rodríguez died in October 1984.

Personal life
While on tour in New York, Rodríguez met a young lady who worked as a secretary for the American Express Company by the name of Elba López Pérez. Rodríguez and Elba were married in 1951 and in 1953, they had their first child, in New York, whom they named Pedro. The family was constantly on the go and in 1954 Elba gave birth to their second child, Michael, in Puerto Rico. In the late 1950s Rodríguez moved with his family to Chicago and Elba gave birth to their third son, Tommy (who followed in Pellin's footsteps and became a salsa singer). In 1960, Rodríguez moved with his family to Puerto Rico. Rodriguez and his wife bought a house in the city of Bayamón.

In June 1984, just a few months before his passing, Rodríguez had a concert in Puerto Rico where he celebrated his 45th anniversary in the music business. A few songs from this concert appear on the album Los 45 Años De Pellín Rodríguez.

Rodríguez died on October 31, 1984 in San Juan, Puerto Rico after suffering a stroke at the age of 57. Before he died, he had the pleasure of witnessing the graduation of his first born, Pedro Rodriguez, who earned a master's degree in mechanical engineering from the University of Alabama in Huntsville while working in NASA. Pedro became the director of a test laboratory at NASA and invented a portable, battery-operated lift seat for people suffering from knee arthritis. Rodríguez is survived by his wife Elba, his sons Pedro, Michael, Tommy.

Rodríguez is buried in the San José Cemetery in Villa Palmeras, Santurce, Puerto Rico.

Legacy
Puerto Rico has honored the memory of Rodríguez by naming a street in Santurce after him. In the Villa Palmeras neighborhood in Santurce there is a square named "Plaza De Los Salseros" which has a statue and plaque dedicated to Pellin Rodríguez.

Discography

Singles

EPs & LPs

Compilations (EPs & LPs)

Notes

See also

List of Puerto Ricans
Dr. Pedro Rodriguez

References

External links
 
 

1926 births
1984 deaths
People from Santurce, Puerto Rico
20th-century Puerto Rican male singers
Singers from San Juan, Puerto Rico
Salsa musicians